Nurul Islam ( 10 May 1931  Molakhowa in Dhubri district (Assam)) is a leader  from Assam. He served as member of the Lok Sabha representing Dhubri (Lok Sabha constituency). He was elected to 7th, 10th and 11th Lok Sabha.

References

India MPs 1996–1997
People from Dhubri district
1931 births
Living people
India MPs 1991–1996
India MPs 1980–1984
Lok Sabha members from Assam
Indian National Congress politicians from Assam